"Flash", also recorded in an English-language version under the title "One Love to Give",  is a 1986 song recorded by Princess Stéphanie of Monaco. It was the second single of her first album, Besoin. Released at the end of 1986, it was a hit in several countries, including Sweden where it reached number one on the chart.

Background, release and music video
After the success of her debut single "Ouragan" in 1986 spring (number one in France), Stéphanie decided to continue her musical career releasing an album, Besoin, which achieved a great success on the French Albums Chart (number six, certified Gold disc),. She then followed up "Ouragan" with a second single, "Flash", whose single version was shorter than that of the album. The new single was eagerly anticipated by the public who wanted to see if the princess would be able to reproduce the same success in terms of sales and charting.

As for "Ouragan", Romano Musumarra, a famous composer in the 1980s, participated in the writing and the production of the song, helped by Roberto Zanelli and Michel Jouveaux who also composed the music, which is very melodious.

The song was also recorded in English-language in order to be released, about two months after the original version, in the anglophone countries, being re-entitled "One Love to Give". It was not just a translation : indeed, lyrics are different. Carol Welsman replaced Michel Jouveaux in the composition of the text and the music. The French and English versions are included on the album Besoin as the 9th and 14th tracks ("One Love to Give" features in an extended version which lasts 7:30 with a long musical introduction).

The music video begins with the mention : "Les fantômes existent encore, Stéphanie n'y croyait pas, et pourtant..." In it, Stéphanie has an androgynous look, performing the song in a castle, along with her friend Gérard Blanc - a French singer who had a great success in 1987 with "Une autre histoire" (number two in France) -, who also appears playing the guitar.

Kamil Rustam (another renowned musician  who won the 1985 Victoire de la musique for best arrangement) can also be seen playing the guitar and, in another scene, kissing Stephanie's hand.

As with the video for "Ouragan," the video alternates English and French lyrics.

Chart performances
The song was a hit in France, but achieved a moderate success in comparison of "Ouragan". It went straight to number six on 18 October 1986, and reached a peak of number four in its fourth and fifth weeks on the chart. The single stayed for nine weeks in the top ten and 15 weeks in the top 50. It was certified Silver disc by the SNEP, the French certifier, for at least 250,000 sales.

The single also featured on the Swiss Singles Chart, for only one week, at number 28, on 26 October 1986.

In the English version, the song had a success in Sweden. It debuted at number nine on the Swedish Singles Chart on 17 December 1986, and climbed to number one, where it stayed for one month.

It also peaked for one week at number ten in Germany.

Track listings
 7" single
 "Flash" — 4:20
 "Le Sega mauricien" — 4:30
			
 12" maxi
 "Flash" (remix) — 7:50
 "Le Sega mauricien" (remix) — 4:25

 7" single (English version)
 "One Love to Give" — 4:20
 "Le Sega mauricien" — 4:20

 12" maxi (English version)
 "One Love to Give" (remix) — 7:29
 "Flash — 4:18
 "Le Sega mauricien" — 4:22

Credits
Guy Battarel - remix ("Flash" & "One Love to Give")
Gérard Blanc - arranger ("Le Sega mauricien"), remix ("Flash")
Jean-Philippe Bonichon - engineer, mixing, remix
Thierry Durbet - arranger ("Le Sega mauricien")
Frédéric Meylan - photography
Romano Musumarra - arranger ("Flash" & "One Love to Give")
Yves Roze - producer for Julisa
Franck Segarra - assistant engineer, remix ("One Love to Give")

Cover Versions
Swedish singer Magnus Carlsson released the English & French version
on his studioalbum Pop Galaxy in 2010.

Charts and sales

Peak positions

1 "One Love to Give" (English version)

Certifications

References

External links
 "Flash", lyrics
 "Flash", music video

1986 singles
Princess Stéphanie of Monaco songs
Number-one singles in Sweden
Songs written by Romano Musumarra
Macaronic songs
Songs written by Roberto Zanetti
1986 songs